Shmustar, also spelled Shmistar or Chmistar is a Lebanese town located in Baalbek-Hermel Governorate, Lebanon between Baalbeck and Zahleh, on the eastern slope of Mount Sannine. 
Chmistar has a population of 30,000 according to a 2012 census.

History
In 1838, Eli Smith noted Shmustar's population as being predominantly  Metawileh.

References

Bibliography

External links
Chmestar Municipality  Chmestar Municipality 
Chmistar - Gharbeh Baalbek, Localiban

Populated places in Baalbek District
Shia Muslim communities in Lebanon